Harrison is a village in Calumet and Outagamie Counties, Wisconsin, United States. The village was created on March 8, 2013, from unincorporated areas of the Town of Harrison and a portion of the Town of Buchanan: the right of way along County Trunk Highway KK in Outagamie County. The village is located in what was the northwestern part of the town of Harrison and borders Appleton and Menasha.

Demographics

The 2020 U.S. Census estimates the population of Harrison at around 13,179.

Notes

External links
Town & Village of Harrison 

Villages in Calumet County, Wisconsin
Villages in Outagamie County, Wisconsin
Villages in Wisconsin
Appleton–Fox Cities metropolitan area